The Duet routine competition at the 2022 South American Games was held on 7 and 8 October 2022.

Results
The Technical Routine was started on 7 October. The Free Routine was held on 8 October.

References

Duet technical routine